Robin Hogarth (born 1948) is the British record producer of two Soweto Gospel Choir Grammy Award-winning albums: Blessed in 2006 and African Spirit in 2008.

References

External links
 Robin Hogarth's Official site

British record producers
1948 births
Living people
Place of birth missing (living people)